Belper Congregational Church is a Grade II listed former congregational chapel on Green Lane in Belper, Derbyshire.

History

It was built to replace an earlier chapel of 1790 which the congregation had outgrown.  It was designed by George Woodhouse of Bolton, Architect and built by Mr. Cash of Duffield. It comprised a nave with entrance vestibule and staircase, and a chancel at the east end which contained the organ and choir. On either side of the chancel, vestries were provided. There was a gallery at the west end and provision was made for galleries on each side if later required. The tower at the south-western angle of the building was surmounted by a spire and metal finial. The walls were of stone and both ashlar and dressings were from local quarries. There were sittings for 550 persons. The total cost was about £4,000. The church opened on 13 November 1872.
The church was extended to form a schoolroom in 1899. 
In the 1980s, the church building became surplus to requirements. The congregation moved into a new smaller building behind and in the late 20th century the 1872 building was converted to housing.

See also
Listed buildings in Belper

References

Churches completed in 1872
19th-century churches in the United Kingdom
Chapels in England
Former churches in Derbyshire
Congregational churches in Derbyshire
1790 establishments in England
Grade II listed churches in Derbyshire
Belper